"Padre Don José" is a French-language song written by Jacques Larue (fr) and Alain Romans, originally released in 1956 by Gloria Lasso.

In 1957, Paul Francis Webster wrote English lyrics for the song, titled "Padre". The following year, it was released as a single by Toni Arden. Her version peaked at number 13 on the Billboard Hot 100, and sold over million copies in the United States.

Marty Robbins reached number 5 on Billboards Hot Country Singles chart with his version of "Padre" in 1970.

In a 1958 interview, Elvis Presley said that "Padre" by Toni Arden was his favorite song. He recorded his version on Saturday, May 15, 1971, and it was released on his 1973 album Elvis.

Track listings

Toni Arden version 
Single (1958)
 "Padre"
 "All At Once"

References

External links 
 Toni Arden – Padre / All At Once at Discogs

1956 songs
1956 singles
1958 singles
1970 singles
Elvis Presley songs

Songs with lyrics by Paul Francis Webster